Muktainagar is the Municipal council in district of Jalgaon, Maharashtra.

History
Muktainagar is a Municipal Council city and tehsil in district of Jalgaon, Maharashtra. Muktainagar is a large town with total 5352 families residing. Muktainagar has population of 23970 of which 12433 are males while 11537 are females as per Population Census 2011.

Municipal Council election

Electoral performance 2018

References 

Municipal councils in Maharashtra
Jalgaon district